The 2021-22 SWF Scottish Cup, known as the Biffa Scottish Women's Cup for sponsorship reasons, is the national cup competition in Scottish women's football. The competition was compulsory for all SWPL and championship teams in full membership of Scottish Women's Football.

Results
All results listed are published by Scottish Women's Football (SWF)

Preliminary round
The draw for the preliminary round round took place on Saturday, 1 October 2021 at Hampden Park.

First round
The draw for the first round took place on Wednesday, 26 October 2021 at Hampden Park.

Second round
The draw for the second round took place on Tuesday, 23 November 2021 2021 at Hampden Park.

Third round
The draw for the second round took place on Sunday, 19 December 2021 at Hampden Park.

Fourth round
The draw for the second round took place on Sunday, 9 January 2022 Hampden Park.

Quarter-finals
The draw for the second round took place on Monday, 14 February 2022 Hampden Park.

Semi-finals
The draw for the second round took place on Tuesday, 5 April 2022 Hampden Park.

Final
2021-22 Scottish Women's Cup Final

References

External links
Scottish Women's Cup at Soccerway
Scottish Football Historical Results Archive
SFA Scottish Women's Cup

Scot
Premier League
Scottish Women's Cup